Laguncula is a genus of sea snails, marine gastropod molluscs in the family Naticidae.

Species
Species within the genus Laguncula include:
 Laguncula pulchella Benson, 1842

References 
 Torigoe K. & Inaba A. (2011) Revision on the classification of Recent Naticidae. Bulletin of the Nishinomiya Shell Museum 7: 133 + 15 pp., 4 pls.

External links

Naticidae
Taxa named by William Henry Benson